Events from the year 1311 in Ireland.

Incumbent
Lord: Edward II

Events
 Archbishop de Leche of Dublin received a Papal Bull from Clement V, authorizing him to establish the University of Dublin

Births

Deaths

References

 
1310s in Ireland
Ireland
Years of the 14th century in Ireland